Northbank is a historic plantation house located near Walkerton, King and Queen County, Virginia. The first section was built in 1722, with additions dated to 1827, 1863 and 1911.  It is a -story, frame and clapboard home on a brick foundation.  Also on the property are the contributing smokehouse, kitchen house, pole barn shed, and the family cemetery.  The house remained in the same family from 1722 to 1990.

It was listed on the National Register of Historic Places in 2006.

References

Plantation houses in Virginia
Houses on the National Register of Historic Places in Virginia
Federal architecture in Virginia
Houses completed in 1722
Houses in King and Queen County, Virginia
National Register of Historic Places in King and Queen County, Virginia
1722 establishments in the Thirteen Colonies